For the Honour of Australia is a 1916 film composed of footage from two 1915 Australian silent films, For Australia and How We Beat the Emden, plus the documentary How We Fought the Emden.

Plot
His brother Stanley discovers a German spy ring amongst the social set in Sydney. They capture him and take him to a secret island outpost. Germans are about to destroy an Allied radio station but it manages to alert  beforehand and the ship attacks German sailors. A half-caste islander, Kana (Alma Rock Phillips), leads HMAS Sydney to the spies' island. A landing party attacks and kills the spies but Kana is killed.

Cast
Boyd Irwin as Stanley Lane
Gwen Burroughs as Mrs De Winter
Alma Rock Phillips as Kana
Charles Villiers as Carl Hoffman
Percy Walshe

Production
For Australia and How We Fought the Emden were films made by rival companies but were put together for release in Britain. It is unsure what company did this but the films were made with the approval of both the Australian and British governments.

References

External links
For the Honour of Australia at Australian Screen Online
For the Honour of Australia at BFI
For the Honour of Australia at National Film and Sound Archive
For the Honour of Australia at AustLit

Australian black-and-white films
1910s war drama films
Australian war drama films
Australian silent films
Australian World War I films
1916 films
1916 drama films
Silent war drama films
1910s English-language films